Benjamin Fortson may refer to:

Benjamin W. Fortson Jr. (1904–1979), former Secretary of State of Georgia
Benjamin W. Fortson IV, American linguist